Amirabad (also Romanized as Amīrābād) is a village in Abish Ahmad Rural District, Abish Ahmad District, Kaleybar County, East Azerbaijan Province, Iran. At the 2006 census, its population was 535, in 104 families.

References 

Populated places in Kaleybar County